Someron Voima (abbreviated SoVo) is a sports club from Somero in Finland.  The club was formed in 1932 and their home ground is at the Someron urheilukenttä.  The men's football first team currently plays in the Kutonen.  The Chairman of SoVo is Timo Rannikko and Henri Hakamäki heads the Football Section.

Background
The club currently has sections covering football, volleyball, floorball, futsal, boxing, handball, athletics and keep-fit.  There are also sections for Veterans, Youth and Women for whom various activities are organised.

SoVo has spent many seasons in the lower divisions of the Finnish football league but has been much more successful over the last decade. The club played 3 consecutive seasons in the Kakkonen (Second Division), the third tier of Finnish football from 2005 to 2007 and is now back at that level in 2010 following promotion from the Kolmonen at the end of the 2009 season.

Season to season

Club Structure
SoVo currently has 1 men's team, 1 woman's team, 4 boys teams and 2 girls teams.

2010 season
SoVo Men's Team are competing in Group B (Lohko B) of the Kakkonen administered by the Football Association of Finland  (Suomen Palloliitto) .  This is the third highest tier in the Finnish football system.  In 2009 Someron Voima finished in first position in their Kolmonen (Third Division) section and were promoted to the Kakkonen..

SoVo/2 are participating in Section 2 (Lohko 2) of the Kutonen administered by the Turku SPL.

References and sources
Official Website
Finnish Wikipedia
Suomen Cup

Footnotes

Football clubs in Finland
Somero
1932 establishments in Finland